Alief Early College High School (AECHS) is a magnet high school in Houston, Texas and a part of the Alief Independent School District, in conjunction with Houston Community College. It was scheduled to open in fall 2009, and 120 spaces were to be available for ninth grade students.

The permanent campus was scheduled to open around fall 2010, with a temporary facility used for the school's first year.

It allows students to take courses for dual credit and graduate with both a high school diploma and the equivalence of an associate degree at the same time. As part of the curriculum each student would take up to sixty credits at HCC during his/her high school career.

Admissions
Admission to the Alief Early College High School is by application only.  According to Robin Foster of the Houston Chronicle, admission to the school is not based on ability. Rather, "Students who will be selected are mostly under-represented at four-year colleges or will be the first in their family to attend college.""

References

External links
 

High schools in Houston
Early College
2009 establishments in Texas
Educational institutions established in 2009